Akhona Zennith Makalima (born 27 March 1988) is an international football referee from South Africa who is a listed international referee for FIFA since 2014. She where she officiates for FIFA, the Premier Soccer League, the SASOL Women's League, and the South African Football Association (SAFA).

She holds a national diploma in human resource management from King Hintsa FET College.

References 

Living people
Women association football referees
1988 births
FIFA REFEREE : since 2014